Karen Legg (born 3 June 1978), also known by her married name Karen Crumpler, is an English former freestyle swimmer.

Swimming career
She competed for Great Britain in the Olympics, FINA world championships and European championships, and swam for England in the Commonwealth Games.  During her seven-year international career (1998–2005), she won four world, two European and seven Commonwealth medals.  Legg also competed for Great Britain in the 2000 Summer Olympic Games in Sydney in the women's 4×200-metre freestyle relay.

She represented England and won two silver medals in the relay events, at the 1998 Commonwealth Games in Kuala Lumpur, Malaysia. Four years later she won five more medals, three in the relay events (including a gold medal) and two in the individual events.

She won the 2001 British Championship in the 200 metres freestyle and the 400 metres freestyle.

See also
 List of Commonwealth Games medallists in swimming (women)
 World record progression 4 × 200 metres freestyle relay

References

1978 births
Living people
English female swimmers
English female freestyle swimmers
Medalists at the FINA World Swimming Championships (25 m)
Olympic swimmers of Great Britain
Sportspeople from Poole
Swimmers at the 1998 Commonwealth Games
Swimmers at the 2000 Summer Olympics
Swimmers at the 2002 Commonwealth Games
World Aquatics Championships medalists in swimming
Commonwealth Games medallists in swimming
Commonwealth Games gold medallists for England
Commonwealth Games silver medallists for England
Medallists at the 1998 Commonwealth Games
Medallists at the 2002 Commonwealth Games